EME is a sector of Defence Housing Authority located in Lahore near Thokar Niaz Baig and along the Lahore Branch Distributory Canal covering an area of about 737 acres (5900 kanal (unit)). EME is a highly developed society, there are markets, roads, mosques, parks. The society is sealed from all sides to ensure safety; there are gates on every entry and exit and a sports complex or club.

Sports Club
The sports club offers football, tennis, and various other indoor games such as squash. It is equipped with a gym. It also has a joint cricket academy.

Indoor facilities
Library
Mini Theatre (40 seats)

Outdoor sports facilities
Climbing Arena (60-foot artificial climbing wall)
Cricket Ground with Pavilion (day and night match facility) 
Archery
Mini Golf Course (6 holes putting)
Lawn Tennis Court
Football Ground

References

https://web.archive.org/web/20140826044849/http://dhaemesector.org/photogallerynew.php

Defence, Lahore